It Happened to Adele is a 1917 American silent drama film directed by Van Dyke Brooke and starring Gladys Leslie, Carey L. Hastings and Peggy Burke. Prints and/or fragments were found in the Dawson Film Find in 1978.

Cast
 Gladys Leslie as Adele 
 Carey L. Hastings as Adele's Mother
 Peggy Burke as Blanche
 Charles Emerson as Vincent Harvey
 Clarine Seymour as Mary 
 Wayne Arey as John W. Horton
 Justus D. Barnes as Vincent's Uncle

References

Bibliography
 Donald W. McCaffrey & Christopher P. Jacobs. Guide to the Silent Years of American Cinema. Greenwood Publishing, 1999.

External links
 

1917 films
1917 drama films
1910s English-language films
American silent feature films
Silent American drama films
American black-and-white films
Films directed by Van Dyke Brooke
Pathé Exchange films
1910s American films